Redwitz an der Rodach is a municipality in the district of Lichtenfels in Bavaria in Germany. It lies on the river Rodach.

References

Lichtenfels (district)